Schmidt Theater is a theatre in Hamburg, Germany, located at St. Pauli's Spielbudenplatz.

See also 
 List of theatres in Hamburg 

Theatres in Hamburg
Buildings and structures in Hamburg-Mitte